Mark Anthony Rosales Borboran (born November 1, 1984) is a Filipino professional basketball player for the Rain or Shine Elasto Painters of the Philippine Basketball Association (PBA).

He went to college at the José Rizal University and later he moved to University of the East where he was a vital cog to his college team. Borboran is 6-4 small forward who can shoot, rebound, and pass. He was drafted sixth overall in the 2008 PBA draft by the Air21 Express but was then traded to the Alaska Aces during draft night.

Borboran was part of the UE Red Warriors squad that swept the elimination round (14-0) of the 2007 UAAP season. He won a spot on the mythical team on the same year. He played for Hapee Toothpaste in the amateur league, alongside future top pick Gabe Norwood, which entered the finals twice but lost twice to Harbour Centre.

PBA career statistics

As of the end of 2022–23 season

Season-by-season averages

|-
| align=left | 
| align=left | Alaska
| 22 || 6.6 || .356 || .348 || .545 || 1.1 || .4 || .1 || .1 || 2.1
|-
| align=left | 
| align=left | Alaska
| 49 || 14.0 || .481 || .362 || .625 || 2.5 || .7 || .3 || .3 || 4.5
|-
| align=left rowspan=2| 
| align=left | Alaska
| rowspan=2|40 || rowspan=2|15.7 || rowspan=2|.425 || rowspan=2|.292 || rowspan=2|.629 || rowspan=2|3.1 || rowspan=2|.4 || rowspan=2|.3 || rowspan=2|.4 || rowspan=2|4.8
|-
| align=left | Meralco
|-
| align=left | 
| align=left | Meralco
| 30 || 19.3 || .348 || .226 || .565 || 3.3 || .4 || .4 || .5 || 3.7
|-
| align=left | 
| align=left | Meralco
| 17 || 14.6 || .406 || .375 || .684 || 3.2 || .4 || .5 || .1 || 4.4
|-
| align=left | 
| align=left | Air21
| 26 || 17.7 || .360 || .328 || .571 || 3.3 || .4 || .2 || .2 || 4.4
|-
| align=left | 
| align=left | NLEX
| 35 || 20.8 || .412 || .329 || .688 || 3.3 || .7 || .5 || .3 || 5.2
|-
| align=left rowspan=2| 
| align=left | NLEX
| rowspan=2|32 || rowspan=2|14.6 || rowspan=2|.371 || rowspan=2|.261 || rowspan=2|.923 || rowspan=2|2.2 || rowspan=2|.6 || rowspan=2|.3 || rowspan=2|.4 || rowspan=2|3.8
|-
| align=left | Phoenix
|-
| align=left rowspan=2| 
| align=left | Phoenix
| rowspan=2|40 || rowspan=2|16.1 || rowspan=2|.511 || rowspan=2|.427 || rowspan=2|.771 || rowspan=2|3.3 || rowspan=2|.8 || rowspan=2|.7 || rowspan=2|.4 || rowspan=2|6.5
|-
| align=left | Rain or Shine
|-
| align=left | 
| align=left | Rain or Shine
| 32 || 15.7 || .424 || .344 || .650 || 2.8 || .9 || .6 || .4 || 4.4
|-
| align=left | 
| align=left | Rain or Shine
| 45 || 13.9 || .462 || .289 || .768 || 2.4 || .6 || .4 || .2 || 5.0
|-
| align=left | 
| align=left | Rain or Shine
| 11 || 21.3 || .380 || .162 || .706 || 3.0 || 1.0 || .4 || .2 || 6.6
|-
| align=left | 
| align=left | Rain or Shine
| 22 || 15.1 || .429 || .235 || .750 || 3.1 || .5 || .5 || .2 || 4.7
|-
| align=left | 
| align=left | Rain or Shine
| 30 || 12.8 || .368 || .278 || .750 || 2.4 || .7 || .3 || .3 || 3.3
|-class=sortbottom
| align="center" colspan=2 | Career
| 431 || 15.7 || .422 || .311 || .696 || 2.8 || .6 || .4 || .3 || 4.6

References

1984 births
Living people
Air21 Express players
Alaska Aces (PBA) players
Basketball players from Albay
Filipino men's basketball players
Meralco Bolts players
JRU Heavy Bombers basketball players
NLEX Road Warriors players
People from Albay
Phoenix Super LPG Fuel Masters players
Power forwards (basketball)
Rain or Shine Elasto Painters players
Small forwards
UE Red Warriors basketball players
Barako Bull Energy draft picks